The Hawk and the Dove: Paul Nitze, George Kennan, and the History of the Cold War is Nicholas Thompson's first book. The Hawk and The Dove was published on September 15, 2009 by Henry Holt and Company. The book focuses on the relationship between Paul Nitze and George Kennan, two highly influential Americans with extremely different positions on the Cold War. Nitze, the hawk, was a consummate insider who believed that the best way to avoid a nuclear clash was to prepare to win one. Kennan, the dove, was a diplomat turned academic whose famous X Article persuasively argued that the United States should contain the Soviet Union while waiting for it to collapse from within.

References

2009 non-fiction books
Books about the Cold War